FZ Original Recordings is only available in The Secret Jewel Box set. Steve Vai reflects here on his three years as a member of Frank Zappa's ensemble where he was credited not just as "guitarist" but as wielder of "strat abuse" and "impossible guitar parts." These are Frank Zappa recordings, written and produced by Zappa, and authorized by the Zappa Family Trust.

The booklet contains the original liner notes for each Zappa track, along with Vai's comments on each track.

Track listing
All songs written by Frank Zappa

External links
Discogs

Frank Zappa compilation albums
2001 compilation albums
Progressive rock compilation albums